Bernard Morel (27 March 1946 – 11 November 2021) was a French economist and politician. He was a professor emeritus of economics at the University of Provence and wrote numerous publications on the subject. A member of the Socialist Party, he served as Vice-President of the Regional Council of Provence-Alpes-Côte d'Azur from 2012 until his death in 2021.

Awards
Knight of the Ordre des Palmes académiques

Publications
Évaluation de la qualité de la vie, : prospective de l'agglomération de Rouen (1978)
L'évolution des attitudes envers le travail (1982)
Marseille, l'endroit du décor (1985)
Pour une économie plus humaine (1986)
Marseille, l'état du futur (1988)
Le marché des drogues (1994)
Marseille : naissance d'une métropole (1998)
L'économie : dynamique de la région Provence-Alpes-Côte d’Azur (2002)
Les hommes : dynamique de la région Provence-Alpes-Côte d’Azur (2002)
Du savon à la puce : l'industrie marseillaise du xviie siècle à nos jours (2003)
Le socialisme : l’idée s’est-elle arrêtée en chemin (2008)

References

1946 births
2021 deaths
French economists
French politicians
Socialist Party (France) politicians
Academic staff of the University of Provence
People from Seine-Maritime
Chevaliers of the Ordre des Palmes Académiques